Yurginsky District is the name of several administrative and municipal districts in Russia:
Yurginsky District, Kemerovo Oblast, an administrative and municipal district of Kemerovo Oblast
Yurginsky District, Tyumen Oblast, an administrative and municipal district of Tyumen Oblast

See also
Yurginsky (disambiguation)

References